Rhamnogalacturonan galacturonohydrolase (RG-galacturonohydrolase) is an enzyme with systematic name rhamnogalacturonan oligosaccharide alpha-D-GalA-(1->2)-alpha-L-Rha galacturonohydrolase. This enzyme catalyses the following chemical reaction

 Exohydrolysis of the alpha-D-GalA-(1->2)-alpha-L-Rha bond in rhamnogalacturonan oligosaccharides with initial inversion of configuration releasing D-galacturonic acid from the non-reducing end of rhamnogalacturonan oligosaccharides.

The enzyme is part of the degradation system for rhamnogalacturonan I in Aspergillus aculeatus.

References

External links 
 

EC 3.2.1